Thân Thành Tín (born 30 May 1993) is a Vietnamese footballer who is playing for V-League club Hồ Chí Minh City.

References

1993 births
Living people
Vietnamese footballers
Association football defenders
V.League 1 players
Sportspeople from Hanoi
Saigon FC players
21st-century Vietnamese people